Patrick Stephen Johns, known as Paddy Johns (born 19 February 1968, in Portadown) was an Irish rugby union player from 1990 to 2000. He played mainly as a lock and occasionally in the back-row. He won 59 caps, scoring 4 tries and 20 points. He had his international debut, on 27 October 1990 against Argentina, in Dublin, in a match won 20-18, and his final appearance came on 11 November 2000, with Japan, in a win of 78-9, again in Dublin. He played at the 1995 Rugby World Cup and the 1999 Rugby World Cup. He also played for the Ireland national rugby sevens team at the inaugural 1993 Rugby World Cup Sevens, where Ireland reached the semi-finals, its best ever finish in a Rugby World Cup Sevens.

He studied dentistry at the University of Dublin and currently practices as a dental surgeon.

External links
 

1968 births
Living people
British dentists
Dublin University Football Club players
Dungannon RFC players
Ireland international rugby sevens players
Ireland international rugby union players
Irish rugby union players
People educated at the Royal School Dungannon
Rugby union locks
Rugby union players from Portadown
Saracens F.C. players
Ulster Rugby players